The Escape Team is the 22nd album by New York City-based alternative rock band They Might Be Giants, released on December 10, 2018 for digital download and pre-order. The digital download and pre-order was released simultaneously with My Murdered Remains. The physical album was released in May 2019.

The Escape Team is a concept album, made in collaboration with long-time TMBG music video collaborator David Cowles, based on fictional characters from his original comic book of the same name.

In the year prior to the album's release, songs from The Escape Team were released as part of They Might Be Giants' 2018 Dial-A-Song series. Each song was released with a music video animated and directed by Cowles, with the exception of "The Poisonousness", which was directed by Ajax Digital Design.

Track listing

Personnel
They Might Be Giants
 John Flansburgh – vocals, guitars, programming, etc.
 John Linnell – vocals, keyboards, woodwinds, etc.
Backing Band
 Marty Beller – drums
 Dan Miller – guitars
 Danny Weinkauf – bass guitar
Additional musicians
 Chris Anderson – Bass and mellotron on "Corrupted Lyle".
 Robin Goldwasser - vocals on "The Poisonousness"
Production
 Daniel Avila – engineering
 Pat Dillett – production, mixing
 James York – engineering
 Ue Nastasi – Audio mastering

References

2018 albums
They Might Be Giants albums
Idlewild Recordings albums
Albums produced by Pat Dillett
Concept albums